Höhener is a surname. Notable people with the surname include:

Martin Höhener (born 1980), Swiss ice hockey player
Stefan Höhener (born 1980), Swiss luger